The Wonders is a 2014 internationally co-produced drama film directed by Alice Rohrwacher. It was selected to compete for the Palme d'Or at the 2014 Cannes Film Festival; it won the Grand Prix.

Plot
Gelsomina and her three younger sisters live with their parents on an Italian farm. As the eldest, she takes on a heavier burden, taking care of her sisters and assisting her father, Wolfgang, with beekeeping. One evening, as the family is playing on the beach, they are told to be quieter and discover that a TV show is being filmed nearby.  They watch and, as they are about to leave, the star, Milly, calls them over and gives Gelsomina a hair clip.

Watching the program on TV, Gelsomina learns that it is launching a competition called Countryside Wonders, in which seven farmers will compete to have their products featured. While her father is strongly against participating, her mother warms to the idea, even though the quality of their honey is not great.

Meanwhile, Wolfgang hires a juvenile delinquent named Martin to help with honey production. Martin never talks. Though Wolfgang tries to help Martin, he discovers that he is ineffectual.

Unbeknownst to her father, Gelsomina applies on behalf of her family. She forgets about it after her father's old friend comes to stay. Later, left alone by their parents, while switching out the honeycombs to put in the processor, she accidentally injures one of her sisters, Marinella. At the hospital, while Marinella is being stitched up, Gelsomina realizes that Martin forgot to change the bucket which collects the processed honey and, on returning home, they find honey spilled over the floor. At the same time, they are visited by a man from the competition to inspect their production room. The children clean the work area and they are accepted. However, Wolfgang is infuriated by the news.

Nevertheless, the family competes on the show, where they are dressed in ridiculous garb and must plead their case to the judges. On TV, Wolfgang freezes and cannot explain what makes his honey so special. However, Gelsomina steps up and, with Martin, performs a trick in which he whistles and bees crawl out of her mouth onto her face. The family loses the competition, however. Martin runs away and Gelsomina follows him but cannot find him. On the last boat ride back from the island, she finds herself alone with Milly, who takes off her wig and gives Gelsomina a hairpin. Gelsomina swims back to the island and finds Martin, but returns to her family without him.

Cast
 Alexandra Maria Lungu as Gelsomina
 Sam Louwyck as Wolfgang
 Alba Rohrwacher as Angelica
 André Hennicke as Adrian
 Monica Bellucci as Milly
 Sabine Timoteo as Coco
 Agnese Graziani as Marinella
 Eva Lea Pace Morrow as Caterina
 Maris Stella Morrow as Luna
 Luis Huilca Logrono as Martin
 Margarete Tiesel as social worker

Production
Director Alice Rohrwacher based the movie on her memories of her childhood working for her parents, who were beekeepers. Rohrwacher stated that some parts of the film were filmed illegally, particularly the parts with the bees which they were not supposed to film for insurance purposes and which she filmed anyway on a national holiday when no one was around to stop her.

Reception
The Wonders premiered at the 2014 Cannes Film Festival to positive reviews. On review aggregator Rotten Tomatoes, the film holds an approval rating of 95% based on 63 reviews, with an average rating of 7.3/10. The website's critical consensus reads, "The Wonders offers a charming coming-of-age tale that doubles as a quietly effective tribute to a vanishing way of life." On Metacritic, the film has a score of 76 out of 100, based on 17 critics, indicating "generally positive reviews".

References

External links
 
 
 
 

2014 films
2014 drama films
Films directed by Alice Rohrwacher
Films about insects
Films shot in Lazio
Films shot in Tuscany
Films set in the 1990s
German drama films
Italian drama films
2010s Italian-language films
Swiss drama films
Cannes Grand Prix winners
2010s German films